IBA or Iba may refer to:

Iba

People
Clarence Iba (1909-1997), American basketball coach
Erol Iba (born 1979), Indonesian footballer
Henry Iba (1904-1993), American basketball coach
Moe Iba (born 1939), American basketball coach
Itsuki Iba, a fictional character in the Japanese light novel series Rental Magica

Places
Iba, Osun State, town in Nigeria
Iba, Zambales, municipality in Zambales, Philippines
Roman Catholic Diocese of Iba

IBA

Organizations
Independent Broadcasting Authority, a defunct regulatory body in the United Kingdom
Indian Banks' Association
Institute of Business Administration (disambiguation)
Intercollegiate Biomathematics Alliance
International Bank of Asia, a defunct bank in Hong Kong, now Fubon Bank
International Bank of Azerbaijan
International Bar Association
International Bartenders Association, which set out IBA Official Cocktail regulation 
International Basketball Association
International Bear Association aka The International Association for Bear Research and Management
International Bodyboarding Association
International Boxing Association (amateur), sport organization that sanctions amateur boxing
International Bryozoology Association
International Buddhist Academy
Ion Beam Applications,  solutions for the diagnosis and treatment of cancer
Iron Butt Association
Israel Broadcasting Authority, the former Israeli public broadcaster
ÍB Akureyri, former Icelandic sports club, abbreviated ÍBA

Other
AAPG Imperial Barrel Award Program
iBooks Author, iPad ebook authoring software (usually iBA), IBA can also refer to its file format
Interest-based advertising
Important Bird Area
Incinerator bottom ash
Indole-3-butyric acid - auxin, a plant rooting hormone
InfiniBand Architecture
Interceptor Body Armor
Internationale Bauausstellung
Ion beam analysis, a set of analytical techniques involving the use of ion beams
Isobutyl alcohol, an organic solvent